Kepler-8 is a star located in the constellation Lyra in the field of view of the Kepler Mission, a NASA-led operation tasked with discovering terrestrial planets. The star, which is slightly hotter, larger, and more massive than the Sun, has one gas giant in its orbit, Kepler-8b. This gas giant is larger than Jupiter, but is less massive, and thus more diffuse. The planet's discovery was announced to the public on January 4, 2010 along with four other planets. As the fifth confirmed planetary system verified by Kepler, it helped demonstrate the capabilities of the Kepler spacecraft.

Nomenclature and history
Kepler-8 was named the way it was because it is home to the eighth planetary system confirmed during the course of the Kepler Mission, a NASA-directed program tasked with searching a region of the sky for terrestrial planets that transit, or cross in front of (and thereby, for a while, make dimmer) the stars that they orbit with respect to Earth. The planet in orbit around Kepler-8, Kepler-8b, was the fifth of the first five planets discovered by the Kepler spacecraft; the first three planets confirmed by Kepler had been previously discovered, and were only used to verify the accuracy of Kepler's measurements. Kepler-8b's discovery was announced to the public on January 4, 2010 at the 215th meeting of the American Astronomical Society in Washington, D.C., alongside planets in orbit around Kepler-4, Kepler-5, Kepler-6, and Kepler-7.

The data that was used to identify Kepler-8b's existence was re-examined and verified by observatories in Hawaii, Arizona, Texas, California, and the Canary Islands.

Characteristics
Kepler-8 is situated some 1050 pc (or  light years) from Earth. With a mass of 1.213 Msun and a radius of 1.486 Rsun, Kepler-8 is more massive than the Sun by about a fifth of the Sun's mass, and is nearly three halves its size. The star is predicted to be 3.84 (± 1.5) billion years old, compared to the Sun's age at 4.6 billion years. Kepler-8 has a metallicity of [Fe/H] = -0.055 (± 0.03), making it 12% less metal-rich than the metal-rich Sun; metallicity is important in stars because stars richer in metal are more likely to harbor planets. The star also has an effective temperature of 6213 (± 150) K, meaning that it is hotter than the Sun, which has an effective temperature of 5778 K.

Kepler-8 has an apparent magnitude of 13.9; in other words, as seen from Earth, Kepler-8 is an extremely dim star. It cannot be seen with the naked eye.

Planetary system
Kepler-8b is the only planet that has been discovered orbiting of Kepler-8. With a mass of .603 MJ and a radius of 1.419 RJ, the planet is 60% the mass of, but 42% larger than planet Jupiter. The planet is diffuse, with a density of .261 grams/cc, especially in comparison to Jupiter and its density of 5.515 grams/cc. At a distance of .0483 AU, Kepler-8b orbits its star every 3.5225 days. The eccentricity of Kepler-8 is assumed to be 0, which would give the planet a circular orbit. In comparison, planet Mercury orbits the Sun at .3871 AU every 87.97 days. Mercury also has an elliptical orbit, with an eccentricity of .2056.

See also
 List of extrasolar planets
 Kepler Mission

References

Planetary systems with one confirmed planet
Lyra (constellation)
10
Planetary transit variables
F-type main-sequence stars